Room to Let may refer to:

 Room to let, a form of housing
 Room to Let (1950 film), a British historical thriller film